An incomplete series of events, births and deaths which occurred in Italy in 1509:

 Battle of Agnadello
The Battle of Agnadello, also known as Vailà, was one of the more significant battles of the War of the League of Cambrai, and one of the major battles of the Italian Wars.

 Battle of Polesella
The Battle of Polesella, fought on December 22, 1509, by forces of the Duchy of Ferrara and the Republic of Venice, was a naval battle on the River Po in the War of the League of Cambrai in the Italian Wars. It was an overwhelming victory for Ferrara.

 Siege of Padua
The Siege of Padua was a major engagement early in the War of the League of Cambrai.

Births
 Bernardino Telesio
 Ippolito II d'Este
 Giovanni Morone

Deaths
 Pietro del Donzello
 Vicino da Ferrara
 Giovanni Cavalcanti (poet)

References 

 Norwich, John Julius. A History of Venice. New York: Vintage Books, 1989. .